Jiří Welsch (born 27 January 1980) is a Czech former professional basketball player for BK Pardubice of the Czech Republic National Basketball League. He has also represented the senior Czech Republic national basketball team. Welsch has played in the National Basketball Association in the United States, having been drafted in 2002 by the Philadelphia 76ers.

Professional career

Early years
Welsch began his professional career as a teenager with BK JIP Pardubice of the Czech Republic League, where he played until 1998. He then signed with CSA Sparta Prague of the Czech Republic League for the 1998–99 season, and then he moved to Union Olimpija Ljubljana of the Slovenian League, where he played until 2002. He was named the Slovenian League Most Valuable Player following the 2001–02 season campaign.

NBA
Welsch was drafted by the NBA's Philadelphia 76ers with the 16th selection of the 2002 NBA draft, but he was immediately traded to the Golden State Warriors for a future first-round draft pick and a future first- or second-round draft pick. He spent one season with the Warriors, averaging 1.6 points per game, 0.8 rebounds per game, and 0.7 assists per game in 37 games in the 2002–03 season before he was traded to the Dallas Mavericks, along with Antawn Jamison, Chris Mills and Danny Fortson, in exchange for Evan Eschmeyer, Nick Van Exel, Avery Johnson, Popeye Jones and Antoine Rigaudeau on 18 August 2003. Without ever playing a game for them, Welsch, along with Mills, Raef LaFrentz and a lottery-protected 2004 NBA Draft pick, was traded by Dallas to the Boston Celtics on 20 October 2003 in exchange for Antoine Walker and Tony Delk. Welsch started 68 games for the Celtics in the 2003–04 season, averaging 9.2 points per game.

Welsch averaged 8.5 points, 3.2 rebounds, and 2.0 assists per game in 136 games played (100 of them starts) in 2003–04 and 2004–05, while playing with the Celtics. On 24 February 2005, Welsch was traded to the Cleveland Cavaliers for a future 2007 first-round draft pick.

On 28 June 2005, Welsch was traded by the Cavs to the Milwaukee Bucks for a 2006 second-round draft pick.

Welsch's final NBA game was played in Game 5 of the 2006 Eastern Conference First Round on May 3rd, 2006 against the Detroit Pistons. The Bucks would lose the game 93 - 122 and drop the series to Detroit 4 - 1, with Welsch recording 2 points, 1 assist and 1 rebound.

Back to Europe
In August 2006, Welsch decided to leave the NBA, and he signed with the Spanish ACB league club Unicaja Málaga. After playing with Estudiantes Madrid, he signed a contract with Spirou Basket, of Belgium, in July 2011. In 2012, he signed with ČEZ Nymburk. He joined BK Pardubice in 2017.

National team career
Welsch has been a member of the senior Czech Republic national basketball team. He played at the following EuroBasket tournaments: the 1999 EuroBasket, the 2007 EuroBasket, the 2013 EuroBasket, the 2015 EuroBasket, and the 2017 EuroBasket.

Career statistics

NBA

Regular season

|-
| align="left" | 2002–03
| align="left" | Golden State
| 37 || 0 || 6.3 || .253 || .250 || .759 || .8 || .7 || .2 || .1 || 1.6
|-
| align="left" | 2003–04
| align="left" rowspan=2| Boston
| 81 || 68 || 26.9 || .428 || .381 || .743 || 3.7 || 2.3 || 1.2 || .1 || 9.2
|-
| align="left" | 2004–05
| 55 || 32 || 20.5 || .428 || .323 || .773 || 2.5 || 1.5 || .7 || .1 || 7.5
|-
| align="left" | 2004–05
| align="left" | Cleveland
| 16 || 0 || 12.0 || .235 || .182 || .714 || 1.8 || 1.2 || .3 || .0 || 2.9
|-
| align="left" | 2005–06
| align="left" | Milwaukee
| 58 || 2 || 14.9 || .387 || .286 || .747 || 1.9 || 1.1 || .6 || .0 || 4.3
|- class="sortbottom"
| style="text-align:center;" colspan="2"| Career
| 247 || 102 || 18.6 || .403 || .343 || .752 || 2.4 || 1.5 || .8 || .1 || 6.1

Playoffs

|-
| align="left" | 2003–04
| align="left" | Boston
| 4 || 4 || 26.0 || .478 || .250 || 1.000 || 3.0 || 2.3 || .5 || .0 || 8.0
|-
| align="left" | 2005–06
| align="left" | Milwaukee
| 4 || 0 || 3.8 || .500 || .000 || .750 || .8 || .5 || .3 || .0 || 1.8
|- class="sortbottom"
| style="text-align:center;" colspan="2"| Career
| 8 || 4 || 14.9 || .481 || .250 || .923 || 1.9 || 1.4 || .4 || .0 || 4.9

References

External links
Official Website 
NBA.com Profile – Jiri Welsch
Euroleague.net Player Profile
FIBA Profile
FIBA Europe Profile
Spanish League Profile 

1980 births
Living people
ABA League players
Baloncesto Málaga players
BK Pardubice players
Boston Celtics players
CB Estudiantes players
Basketball Nymburk players
Cleveland Cavaliers players
Czech expatriate basketball people in Spain
Czech expatriate basketball people in the United States
Czech expatriate basketball people in Slovenia
Czech men's basketball players
Czech expatriate basketball people in Belgium
Golden State Warriors players
KK Olimpija players
Liga ACB players
Milwaukee Bucks players
Sportspeople from Pardubice
Philadelphia 76ers draft picks
Point guards
Shooting guards
Small forwards
Spirou Charleroi players